Guernsey is a town in Poweshiek County, Iowa, United States. The population was 63 at the time of the 2020 census.

History
Guernsey was platted in 1884. It was named after Guernsey County, Ohio. A post office was first established in Guernsey in 1884.

Geography
Guernsey is located at  (41.650087, -92.344498).

Demographics

2010 census
As of the census of 2010, there were 63 people, 27 households, and 18 families living in the town. The racial makeup of the city was 96.8% White. Hispanic or Latino of any race were 3.2% of the population.

There were 27 households, of which 22.2% had children under the age of 18 living with them, 55.6% were married couples living together, 11.1% had a female householder with no husband present, and 33.3% were non-families. 25.9% of all households were made up of individuals, and 11.1% had someone living alone who was 65 years of age or older. The average household size was 2.33 and the average family size was 2.83.

The median age in the town was 43.8 years. 23.8% of residents were under the age of 18; 6.3% were between the ages of 18 and 24; 22.2% were from 25 to 44; 19.1% were from 45 to 64; and 28.6% were 65 years of age or older. The gender makeup of the town was 52.4% male and 47.6% female.

2000 census
As of the census of 2000, there were 70 people, 29 households, and 20 families living in the town. The racial makeup of the city was 94.29% White, 1.43% Native American, 2.86% from other races, and 1.43% from two or more races. Hispanic or Latino of any race were 4.29% of the population.

There were 29 households, out of which 34.5% had children under the age of 18 living with them, 62.1% were married couples living together, 3.4% had a female householder with no husband present, and 31.0% were non-families. 31.0% of all households were made up of individuals, and 6.9% had someone living alone who was 65 years of age or older. The average household size was 2.41 and the average family size was 3.05.

In the town, the population was spread out, with 28.6% under the age of 18, 5.7% from 18 to 24, 24.3% from 25 to 44, 32.9% from 45 to 64, and 8.6% who were 65 years of age or older. The median age was 35 years. For every 100 females, there were 118.8 males. For every 100 females age 18 and over, there were 127.3 males.

The median income for a household in the city was $36,250, and the median income for a family was $46,250. Males had a median income of $26,250 versus $16,458 for females. The per capita income for the city was $17,727. None of the population and none of the families were below the poverty line.

Education
The BGM Community School District operates the local area public schools.  BGM Community School District was formed in 1960 with the merger of schools in Brooklyn, Guernsey, and Malcom.

References

Cities in Iowa
Cities in Poweshiek County, Iowa
1884 establishments in Iowa